The C.P. Stacey Prize (also known as the C.P Stacey Award) is given by the C.P. Stacey Award Committee and the Laurier Centre for Military Strategic and Disarmament Studies (the LCMSDS took over administration of the award in 2018 from the Canadian Committee for the History of the Second World War) "for distinguished publications on the twentieth-century military experience." It is named in memory of Charles Perry Stacey who was the official historian of the Canadian Army in the Second World War.

Winners
1988 - Norman Hillmer, W. A. B. Douglas: The Official History of the Royal Canadian Air Force, Volume II: The Creation of a National Air Force
1990 - Robert Vogel, Terry Copp: Maple Leaf Route
1992 - Bill McAndrew, Terry Copp: Battle Exhaustion
1994 - Desmond Morton: When Your Number's Up
1996 - George Blackburn: The Guns of Victory
1998 - Jonathan F.W. Vance: Death So Noble: Memory, Meaning and the First World War
2000 - Tim Cook: No Place to Run: The Canadian Corps and Gas Warfare in the First World War
2002 - Brian Tennyson, Roger Sarty: Guardian of the Gulf: Sydney, Cape Breton and the Atlantic Wars 
2004 - Marc Milner: Battle of the Atlantic
2004 - Béatrice Richard: La mémoire de Dieppe - Radioscopie d'un mythe
2006 - Douglas Delaney: Bert Hoffmeister: The Soldier's General
2008 - Stephen Brumwell: Paths of Glory: The Life and Death of General James Wolfe
2008 - Paul Douglas Dickson: A Thoroughly Canadian General: A Biography of General H.D.G. Crerar
2010 - Kevin Spooner: Canada, The Congo Crisis and U.N. Peacekeeping
2011 - Carman Miller: A Knight in Politics: A Biography of Sir Frederick Borden
2012 - Dean Frederick Oliver, Jack Granatstein: The Oxford Companion to Canadian Military History
2013 - Andrew Burtch: Give Me Shelter: The Failure of Canada’s Cold War Civil Defence
2014 - Teresa Iacobelli: Death or Deliverance: Canadian Courts Martial in the Great War
2015 - Tim Cook: The Necessary War, Volume 1: Canadians Fighting The Second World War:1939-1943
2015 - Richard M. Reid - African Canadians in Union Blue: Volunteering for the Cause in the Civil War
2016 - Brock Millman: Polarity, Patriotism and Dissent in Great War Canada, 1914-1919
2017 - Geoffrey Hayes: Crerar's Lieutenants: Inventing the Canadian Junior Army Officer, 1939-45
2018 - Jonathan F.W. Vance: A Township at War
2019 - Bob Bergen: Scattering Chaff: Canadian Air Power and Censorship during the Kosovo War
2020/21 - Irene Gammel: I Can Only Paint: The Story of Battlefield Artist Mary Riter Hamilton

References

Awards established in 1988
1988 establishments in Canada
English-language literary awards
Canadian non-fiction literary awards